Henidar may refer to:
 Henidar-e Ebrahim Khan
 Henidar-e Mafruzeh